The 2015 Tulsa Golden Hurricane men's soccer team represented the University of Tulsa during the 2015 NCAA Division I men's soccer season. It was the program's 36th season.

Roster

Schedule

Exhibition

Regular season

AAC tournament

NCAA tournament

References

External links
2015 Tulsa Final Game Notes

Tulsa
Tulsa Golden Hurricane, Soccer
Tulsa
2015